Juxtaposed with another zinc finger protein 1 (JAZF1) also known as TAK1-interacting protein 27 (TIP27) or zinc finger protein 802 (ZNF802) is a protein that in humans is encoded by the JAZF1 gene. Variants are associated with an increased risk of prostate cancer, an increased risk of type 2 diabetes, and an increased height.

Function 

This gene encodes a nuclear protein with three C2H2-type zinc fingers, and functions as a transcriptional repressor. Chromosomal aberrations involving this gene are associated with endometrial stromal tumors. Alternatively spliced variants which encode different protein isoforms have been described; however, not all variants have been fully characterized

References

Further reading